Science Fiction Awards Watch was a blog created in 2007 by Cheryl Morgan and Kevin Standlee, providing information on science fiction awards. It succeeded their fanzine Emerald City which shut down in November 2006. Its objective was report awards and the process through which winners were selected, as well as to allow reader interaction. 

Notable contributors include John Clute, Joe Gordon, Chris Roberson, Anna Tambour, Jeff VanderMeer, and Gary K. Wolfe. 

It has been noted as a source of "unbiased reporting and astute commentary" by SF author James Patrick Kelly in Asimov's Science Fiction Magazine. 

As of February 2020, the site is unavailable.

References

External links
 - unavailable as of February 2020.
Twitter account - not updated since October 2012.

Internet properties established in 2007
Science fiction websites
British literature websites